The Minnesota Twins are a Major League Baseball (MLB) franchise based in Minneapolis, Minnesota. They play in the American League Central division. They formerly played in Washington, D.C. as the Washington Senators before moving to Minnesota after the 1960 season. The first game of the new baseball season for a team is played on Opening Day, and being named the Opening Day starter is an honor, which is often given to the player who is expected to lead the pitching staff that season, though there are various strategic reasons why a team's best pitcher might not start on Opening Day. The Twins have used 26 different Opening Day starting pitchers in their 51 seasons in Minnesota. Starters have a combined Opening Day record of 14 wins, 25 losses and 12 no decisions. No decisions are only awarded to the starting pitcher if the game is won or lost after the starting pitcher has left the game.

Brad Radke holds the Minnesota Twins record for most Opening Day starts with nine.  He has a record in Opening Day starts for the Twins of four wins and two losses (4–2) with three no decisions.  Bert Blyleven had six Opening Day starts for the Twins and Frank Viola had four. Radke has the record for most wins in Minnesota Twins Opening Day starts with four. Liván Hernández, Mudcat Grant, and Dean Chance share the best winning percentage in Opening Day starts with one win and no losses (1–0) each.  Kevin Tapani has the worst winning percentage, losing both Opening Day starts he made for the Twins (0–2).

Overall, Minnesota Twins Opening Day starting pitchers have a record of 4–7 with three no decisions at Metropolitan Stadium and a 1–4 record with one no decision at the Hubert H. Humphrey Metrodome. Their first home opener in their current ballpark of Target Field was in 2013. This gives their Opening Day starting pitchers' combined home record 5–11 with four no no decisions. Their away record is 9–14 with eight no decisions. The Twins lost both Opening Day games in the years in which they won the World Series.

Key

Pitchers

References

Opening day starters
Lists of Major League Baseball Opening Day starting pitchers